Halothamnus iranicus is a species of the plant genus Halothamnus that belongs to the subfamily Salsoloideae of the family Amaranthaceae (formerly Chenopodiaceae). It occurs in Southwest Asia.

Morphology 
Halothamnus iranicus is a sub-shrub up to 45 cm high and 100 cm in diameter, with blueish-green branches. It smells unpleasantly like rancid butter. The leaves are linear to triangular-ovate, and up to 11 mm long. The flowers are at 1–6 mm distance from each other, 3.2-4.2 mm long, longer than their bract and bracteoles, with oblong-ovate tepals. The stigmas are tapering towards the apex. The winged fruit is 7–11 mm in diameter, their wings inserting at 1/3 of the fruit height. The fruit tube is nearly cylindrical, with narrow, sharp-edged peripheral rim and small, ovate pits.

Taxonomy 
Halothamnus iranicus has been first described in 1981 by Victor Petrovič Botschantzev (in: Bot. Mater. Gerb. Bot. Inst. Komarova Akad. Nauk SSSR 18, p. 153). Within the genus, it belongs to the section Halothamnus.

Distribution 
Halothamnus iranicus is endemic in southern Iran and in southwest Pakistan (Baluchistan). It grows in habitats with a mild winter climate, on rocky, stony, partly salty soils, from 0–930 m above sea level.

References 

 Gabriele Kothe-Heinrich: Revision der Gattung Halothamnus (Chenopodiaceae). Bibliotheca Botanica Bd. 143, Schweizerbart, Stuttgart 1993, p. 57-61
 Gabriele Kothe-Heinrich: Halothamnus. - In: Karl Heinz Rechinger et al. (Edit.): Flora Iranica Bd. 172, Chenopodiaceae - Akad. Druck, Graz 1997, p. 263-265, and fig.7-8, tab.148

External links 

Halothamnus iranicus at Tropicos

iranicus
Taxa named by Victor Botchantsev